Ian John Moor (born 4 January 1974, in North Ferriby, East Riding of Yorkshire) is an English singer, and the Stars in Their Eyes Champion of Champions.

Career
In 1999 Moor won the ITV show Stars in Their Eyes produced by Granada Television, Manchester in 1999, with his impersonation of Irish musician and songwriter Chris De Burgh.  He sang De Burgh's 1986 song "The Lady in Red".

The following year, in 2000 Moor returned for his final appearance on Stars in Their Eyes as a guest, returning for the eleventh series live grand final, (won by the Freddie Mercury impersonator). Moor was joined on stage during his performance by De Burgh for a duet. Following success on Stars in Their Eyes, in 2000, Moor went on to record an album with BMG. Entitled Naturally, it peaked at No. 38 on the  UK Albums Chart.

References

1974 births
Living people
English male singers
People from North Ferriby
Musicians from Kingston upon Hull
21st-century English singers
21st-century British male singers